Cellulosilyticum is a mesophilic bacterial genus from the family of Lachnospiraceae.

References

Further reading 
 
 

 

Lachnospiraceae
Bacteria genera